In enzymology, a sym-norspermidine synthase is an enzyme that catalyzes the chemical reaction

S-adenosylmethioninamine + propane-1,3-diamine  5'-methylthioadenosine + bis(3-aminopropyl)amine

Thus, the two substrates of this enzyme are S-adenosylmethioninamine and propane-1,3-diamine, whereas its two products are 5'-methylthioadenosine and bis(3-aminopropyl)amine.

This enzyme belongs to the family of transferases, specifically those transferring aryl or alkyl groups other than methyl groups.  The systematic name of this enzyme class is S-adenosylmethioninamine:propane-1,3-diamine 3-aminopropyltransferase. This enzyme participates in urea cycle and metabolism of amino groups.

References

 
 

EC 2.5.1
Enzymes of unknown structure